Sir Martin Benedict Spencer (born 17 June 1956) is a British High Court judge. 

Spencer was educated at Hertford College, Oxford where he completed an MA and the BCL. He was called to the bar at the Inner Temple in 1979, practising from Halisham Chambers from 1981 where he was head of chambers from 2009 to 2016. He took silk in 2003 and served as a recorder from 2011 to 2017. 

On 2 October 2017, he was appointed a judge of the High Court and assigned to the Queen's Bench Division. He took the customary knighthood in the same year. From 2017, he serves as chair of the Expert Witness Institute and since 2019 serves on the Judicial Security Committee.

In 1977, he married Lisbet Steengaard Jensen, with whom he has two sons and a daughter.

References 

Living people
1956 births
21st-century English judges
Knights Bachelor
Alumni of Hertford College, Oxford
Members of the Inner Temple
Queen's Bench Division judges
English King's Counsel
21st-century King's Counsel